Candida rhizophoriensis is a yeast species first found in the Florida Everglades.

References

Further reading

rhizophoriensis
Yeasts